Interleukin 34 (IL-34) is a protein belonging to a group of cytokines called interleukins. It was originally identified in humans, by large scale screening of secreted proteins; chimpanzee, murine, rat and chicken interleukin 34 orthologs have also been found. The protein is composed of 241 amino acids, 39 kilodaltons in mass, and forms homodimers. IL-34 increases growth or survival of immune cells known as monocytes; it elicits its activity by binding the Colony stimulating factor 1 receptor. 

Messenger RNA (mRNA) expression of human IL-34 is most abundant in spleen but occurs in several other tissues: thymus, liver, small intestine, colon, prostate gland, lung, heart, brain, kidney, testes, and ovary. The discovery of IL-34 protein in the red pulp of the spleen suggests involvement in growth and development of myeloid cells, consistent with its activity on monocytes.

References

External links
 
 

Interleukins
Signal transduction